Fame was built at Quebec in 1812 and was lost in 1817 after transporting convicts to New South Wales.

Career
Fame entered the Register of Shipping in 1813 with Shivewright, master, changing to Gardner, Linthorn, owner, changing to Bell & Co., burthen 475 tons, changing to 489 tons, and trade "London", changing to "London transport". Lloyd's Register had Gardner, master, Linthorne, owner, burthen 489 tons, and trade London.

The Register of Shipping for 1816 had Gardner, master, changing to Dale, and trade "London transport" changing to London—Botany Bay.

Fame, under the command of Captain Henry Dale, and with John Mortimer as surgeon, left Spithead 9 October 1816. She arrived at Port Jackson on 8 March 1817. She embarked with 200 male convicts, two of whom died on the way. Lieutenant Orange commanded 30 other ranks from the 48th Regiment of Foot, who provided the guard.

Fate
There is some ambiguity about Fames fate. Fame left Sydney on 1 May, bound for Batavia and Calcutta. One highly credible source reports that Fame was wrecked in the Torres Strait about the middle of 1817, probably in May.

However, Lloyd's Register and the Register of Shipping continued to carry Fame well into the 1820s with information that was contradictory and stale. Both registers were only as accurate as owners of vessels chose to keep them.

Citations and references
Citations

References

 

1812 ships
Age of Sail merchant ships
Merchant ships of the United Kingdom
Convict ships to New South Wales
Maritime incidents in 1817